The Minister for Justice is a senior minister in the Government of Ireland and leads the Department of Justice. The Minister for Justice has overall responsibility for law and order in Ireland.

The current Minister for Justice is Simon Harris, TD. He is holding this position in a temporary capacity during the maternity leave of Helen McEntee, TD, who continues as a minister without portfolio. Harris is assisted by a Minister of State:
James Browne, TD – Minister of State for Youth Justice and Law Reform

History
From 1919 until 1924 the position was known as the Minister for Home Affairs. In 1997, the functions of the Minister for Equality and Law Reform were transferred to this Minister, and it was renamed as the Minister for Justice, Equality and Law Reform, a title which it retained until 2010. The minister held the title of  Minister for Justice and Equality from 2011 to 2020. As of 2020, the position is known as Minister for Justice. This followed a transfer of functions to the Minister for Children, Equality, Disability, Integration and Youth.

Overview
The Minister's main areas of responsibility include:
Implementing government policy and proposing new policy on crime, immigration, asylum, criminal and civil law reform and the criminal justice system in general.
Implementation of government policy and proposing new policy in relation to national security (an area many countries assign to a separate 'Home' or 'Homeland Security' minister)
Control and reform of the Garda Síochána
Pardons (which are formally given by the President on the binding "advice" of the government, after proposal by the Minister for Justice - a rarely used power)
Implementation of core elements of the Good Friday Agreement.

List of office-holders

Notes

References

External links
Department of Justice

 
Justice
Justice
Ireland, Justice
Ireland
Minister